Chris Neil (born June 18, 1979) is a Canadian former professional ice hockey right winger. Neil was drafted in the sixth round, 161st overall, in the 1998 NHL Entry Draft by the Ottawa Senators, and played his entire NHL career with the Senators organization. He was best known for his role as an enforcer. In September 2022, Neil became the vice president of business and community development for the Senators.

Playing career

Amateur
Neil started out playing minor hockey in the town of Flesherton, Ontario. He later played for the Grey-Bruce Highlanders of the South-Central Triple A Hockey League before getting his junior start with the Junior "B" Orangeville Crushers.

He then played three successful major junior seasons with the Ontario Hockey League (OHL)'s North Bay Centennials. In his final junior season in North Bay, Neil had a career year and gave an indication that he could be more than merely a physical presence, amassing 72 points in 66 games.

Professional
Neil was drafted by the Senators in the sixth round, 161st overall, of the 1998 NHL Entry Draft. Ottawa management prized his toughness and work ethic and saw Neil as a player who would potentially fill a much needed role on the team for years to come. Neil spent two seasons with Ottawa's then-American Hockey League (AHL) affiliate, the Grand Rapids Griffins, where he posted back-to-back seasons of 300+ penalty minutes and established himself as a solid team player at the professional level.

Leading up to the 2001–02 season, Neil had a strong training camp and made the Ottawa line-up. He made his NHL debut on October 3, 2001, against the Toronto Maple Leafs. The next night, he recorded his first NHL point in a game against the Montreal Canadiens. On October 30, he scored his first NHL goal, against the Atlanta Thrashers. In his rookie season, Neil appeared in 72 games and scored 17 points, while accumulating 231 penalty minutes and establishing himself as a fearless combatant.

During the 2002–03 season, Neil had ten points in 68 games and led the Senators with 147 penalty minutes. The next year, he again led the Senators in penalty minutes, with 194.

The 2005–06 season saw Neil's role with the Senators expand. When Brian McGrattan made the Ottawa line-up out of training camp, much of the responsibilities as "team enforcer" were lifted off Neil's shoulders, and he was given the opportunity to contribute in a more offensive role. He responded, and posted the best offensive totals of his NHL career with 16 goals and 33 points. The following season, Neil posted similar numbers with 12 goals and 28 points while leading the NHL in hits. The coaching staff rewarded him with special teams assignments, and he received regular power play shifts.

As the 2007–08 season unfolded, Brian McGrattan saw very limited ice time, and Neil was once again called upon to act as the Senators' enforcer and primary physical presence on many nights. As a result, his offensive production declined, though he did finish the season with a respectable 20 points.

Neil had a disappointing 2008–09 season, registering only ten points, his lowest total since his rookie season, and the Senators missed the Stanley Cup playoffs for the first time during his tenure in Ottawa. After the season, Neil became an unrestricted free agent, and there was speculation that he would sign elsewhere. Instead, however, he signed a four-year, $8 million contract with the Senators. Neil reportedly received offers from three other clubs, but ended up accepting less money to remain in Ottawa.

The 2011–12 season was a good one for both Neil and the Senators. During the regular season, Neil registered 13 goals and 28 points in 72 games, his best offensive totals since 2006–07. Picked by many analysts to finish at or near the bottom of the standings, the Senators made the 2012 playoffs and came within one game of upsetting the first-seeded New York Rangers in the Eastern Conference Quarterfinals. In the series, Neil knocked forward Brian Boyle out of the series with a hit in Game 5 that inflicted a concussion on the player. After the season, after enforcers Matt Carkner and Zenon Konopka departed Ottawa via free agency, the Senators subsequently re-signed Neil to a three-year contract worth $5.75 million.

During the 2012–13 NHL lock-out, Neil elected not to play in Europe, as several of his teammates did, and instead remained in Ottawa and practised with the Carleton Ravens, who were coached by his ex-Senators teammate Shaun Van Allen.

Acknowledging his leadership role with the organization, the Senators named Neil an alternate captain on September 14, 2013. He scored his 100th career regular season NHL goal on January 23, 2014, against Ben Bishop of the Tampa Bay Lightning.

As the 2014–15 season unfolded, Neil was hampered by a hamstring injury that kept him out of the line-up for several games, and he recorded just four goals and seven points in his first 38 games. As the team slipped out of the 2015 playoff picture, General Manager Bryan Murray approached Neil to gauge his willingness to accept a trade to a contending team; Neil indicated that he would prefer to stay in Ottawa, though trade rumours persisted and he saw his role diminish under new head coach Dave Cameron. As many as ten teams reportedly contacted Murray to inquire about Neil's availability as the NHL trade deadline approached. On February 14, 2015, the trade rumours were quieted as Neil suffered a fractured thumb in a fight with Edmonton Oilers winger Luke Gazdic, and the Senators subsequently announced that he would be out of the Ottawa line-up indefinitely as a result.

On February 28, 2016, Neil signed a one-year, $1.5 million contract extension with the Senators to return for the 2016-17 season. Neil played in his 1000th NHL game on December 10, 2016, a road game against the Los Angeles Kings. Neil squared off with Jordan Nolan during that game. Neil was then honored with a pregame ceremony prior to the Senators' December 14 home game against the San Jose Sharks.

In June 2017 it was announced that Neil and the Senators mutually separated due to Neil being displeased with his limited role under head coach Guy Boucher, allowing Neil to become an unrestricted free agent for the 2017-18 season.

On December 14, 2017, Neil announced his retirement from professional ice hockey.

Post-retirement career
Neil served as an assistant coach for his sons' ice hockey teams. In January 2022, Neil and two business partners opened Icelynd Skating Trails, an outdoor skating facility in Stittsville, on land he had purchased while he was still a player. The facility has two skating loops in the forest as well as an outdoor rink, which is rented out for minor league hockey teams and other group events. On September 7, 2022, Neil was promoted to Vice President of Business and Community Development for the Senators. He was previously an Alumni Ambassador representing the team at community events.

On November 8, 2022, the Senators announced that Neil's no. 25 would be retired by the team, with the ceremony to take place before a game against the Chicago Blackhawks on February 17, 2023.

Personal life
Before Neil was married, he and fellow Senator Mike Fisher were roommates and later remained close friends. Neil and his wife have one child. Neil counts Denis Savard as his favourite player growing up. He lists four-wheeling, boating and horseback riding as his favourite hobbies.

On July 14, 2011, Neil and his wife were introduced as the new honorary chairs of Roger's House, an Ottawa pediatric hospice.

Career statistics

Regular season and playoffs

See also
 List of NHL players with 1,000 games played
 List of NHL players with 2,000 career penalty minutes
 List of NHL players who spent their entire career with one franchise

References

External links
 

1979 births
Living people
Binghamton Senators players
Canadian Christians
Canadian ice hockey right wingers
Grand Rapids Griffins (IHL) players
Ice hockey people from Ontario
Mobile Mysticks players
Muskegon Fury players
North Bay Centennials players
Ottawa Senators draft picks
Ottawa Senators players
People from Grey County